The Portage la Prairie Canadian Pacific Railway station is a former Canadian Pacific Railway station that is being restored as a museum.  Passenger rail service in the community is now provided at the Portage la Prairie railway station.

This station was designated a historic site in 1992.

Footnotes

External links 
Station restoration information 

Railway stations in Manitoba
Designated Heritage Railway Stations in Manitoba
Municipal Heritage Sites in Manitoba
Railway stations in Canada opened in 1893
Portage la Prairie
Museums in Manitoba
Canadian Pacific Railway stations
Canadian Register of Historic Places in Manitoba
1893 establishments in Manitoba